Fenia or Pheniyaan is a form of vermicelli from the Indian subcontinent, notably North India . Although similar to the vermicelli used in seviyan and falooda, pheniyaan are much thinner. They have a ritualistic importance for the Karva Chauth festival (celebrated in parts of Northern & Western India) where, along with Lapsi and dry fruits, they are part of the sargi ensemble consumed just before the fast associated with the festival begins.

Etymology 
The word Pheni (singular of Pheniyaan) is derived from Sanskrit word Phenikā, which was an ancient thread like sweet dish made using flour.

References

Indian desserts
Pakistani desserts